Trimeresurus flavomaculatus halieus is a venomous pitviper subspecies endemic to the Philippines.

Geographic range
It is found in the Philippines on the island of Polillo. The type locality given is "Island of Polillo, P.I." (= Philippine Islands).

Taxonomy
Gumprecht (2001, 2002) relegated this subspecies to the synonymy of Trimeresurus flavomaculatus.

References

Further reading
 Griffin, L.E. 1910. A list of snakes from the island of Polillo, P. I., with descriptions of a new genus and two new species. Philippine Journal of Science 5 (4): 211–217.

External links
 

flavomaculatus halieus